Iris Ebling (born 9 May 1940 in Berlin) was a German lawyer who served from 1999 to 2005 as President of the Federal Fiscal Court.

Ebling was the first woman to become President of one of the highest federal courts. In 1974, she was appointed a judge at the Munich Fiscal Court and in 1984 she was elected judge at the Federal Fiscal Court.

Ebling retired at the end of May 2005.

References

1940 births
21st-century German judges
20th-century German judges
Living people
German women judges
20th-century women judges
21st-century women judges
20th-century German women
21st-century German women